The Bhagwant Mann ministry is the State Cabinet of Punjab, India headed by the present Chief Minister Bhagwant Mann. The oath-taking ceremony of Mann was held at Khatkar Kalan village on 16 March 2022. The 10 cabinet ministers took oath on 19 March.

Mann holds the home ministry and agriculture department among other portfolios. Harpal Singh Cheema is the finance minister. Harjot Singh Bains is the Education minister. Gurmeet Singh Meet Hayer is the Sports & Higher Education minister.

History

Inauguration
 

On 10 March, the election results were announced. The Aam Aadmi Party gained a full majority in the sixteenth Punjab Legislative Assembly by winning 92 seats out of 117 total. The opposition parties are the Indian National Congress, the Bharatiya Janata Party, the Shiromani Akali Dal, and the Bahujan Samaj Party.

On 11 March 2022, AAP Punjab convener and MP Bhagwant Mann was elected by the AAP legislative members as their leader in the assembly. Mann took oath as the Chief Minister in the Punjab government in a public ceremony at Khatkar Kalan village on 16 March, when the term of the incumbent Fifteenth Punjab Legislative Assembly expired. 10 cabinet ministers took oath on 19 March at Guru Nanak Dev auditorium of Punjab Raj Bhavan in Chandigarh. Eight ministers who took oath were greenhorn (first term) Members of Legislative Assembly (MLA) while two were in their second term.

The cabinet can have at most 18 ministers, but Mann decided to appoint a smaller cabinet. Mann has set targets for every minister to achieve, saying people "can demand that the minister be removed" if the targets are not met.

Shuffling in the cabinet
In May 2022, health minister Vijay Singla was removed from cabinet, after corruption charges were raised against him.

5 MLAs were inducted into the cabinet and their swearing in ceremony took place on 4 July 2022.

On 7 January 2023, cabinet minister Fauja Singh Sarari resigned as cabinet minister upon corruption allegations following an alleged audio clip of him discussing how to extort money from contractors. He responded by denying the allegations and dubbing the clip of him "doctored". He was replaced by Dr. Balbir Singh.

Major decisions

Ending VIP culture 
Even before taking the oath, CM-designate Mann took steps to end VIP culture by meeting with the Director General of Police (DGP).  Next day, the DGP in charge of security gave orders to withdraw personnel from 122 former MLAs and ministers. A total of 384 policemen previously on security details for those politicians were transferred back to their parent unit.  Mann had stated that the police force was needed for security of the people and not VIPs. As ordered, 21 security personnel, the largest detail in the list, were withdrawn from the service of former transport minister and incumbent MLA Amrinder Singh Raja Warring. Furthermore, 19 personnel were withdrawn from the security of former finance minister Badal, 17 personnel from former education minister Pargat Singh, 16 from former food minister Ashu, and 15 personnel each from former ministers Sangat Singh Gilzian and Randeep Singh Nabha among others. The security of former CMs was continued as they had been provided security on the instructions of the Union Home Ministry. AAP national convener Arvind Kejriwal said Mann "removed the security of old ministers and gave security to the public".

In May 2022, police personnel involved in the security of 424 VIPs were recalled. MLAs, jathedars of two Takhts, heads of various deras and police officers were part of the 424 VIPs

Employment
On 19 March 2022, during the first Cabinet meeting, Mann announced his decision to fill 25,000 job openings in various departments of Punjab government. 10,000 of those vacancies were in the Punjab Police.

On 22 March, he announced his decision to regularise the 35,000 employees in the state working on contractual basis through a bill in the assembly.  In his announcement, he said: "I don't want these teachers protesting on the roads, I had promised to regularise their services, if we are voted to power and I am fulfilling my promise."

In August 2022, only 1,700 patwaris were working in Punjab and more than 3000 seats were vacant. The Revenue Minister ordered the filling of vacancies of 3,660 authorized posts of patwaris.

Education
On 30 March 2022, Mann ordered private schools not to hike their school fees in the year 2022. He also forbade schools from forcing the parents to make school-related purchases from exclusive stores. This was done to protect the consumers from imposed monopoly. The District Regulatory Bodies in the state headed by the Deputy Commissioners were asked by Mann to act immediately on complaints made against erring private schools.

Punjab Education Minister Gurmeet Singh Meet Hayer announced that Education Department of Punjab will distribute free uniforms to 15,49,192 government school students of Class 1 to 8 for the current academic session 2022–23.

Agriculture
On 6 April 2022, 50% compensation as relief was agreed for crop loss in Muktsar district.

To prevent the depletion of ground water table in the state, Punjab government approved an incentive of Rs 1,500 per acre for farmers, that followed the direct seeding of rice technique for the paddy crops.

Anti-Corruption helpline
Mann launched an anti-corruption helpline on Martyrs day (Shaheed Diwas) on 23 March. Mann announced that people could use the helpline to share audio or video evidence for such incidents, and promised that action will be taken on the complaints.

Austerity measures
The number of members of the Punjab Public Service Commission (PPSC) was reduced from existing 10 to 5. CM Mann said that the salaries of these ten members were putting an undue burden on the state exchequer and a reduction was being done to make the Commission work in a cost effective way.

One MLA one pension
Former MLAs in Punjab were getting pension based on the number of terms they had served in the assembly. With every subsequent term served, an additional 66% of the standard pension amount would be added. Mann ordered that all former MLAs will get only one pension irrespective of the number of terms served.

The Punjab State Legislatures Members (Pension and Medical Facilities Regulation) Amendment Bill 2022, was brought to stop multiple term pensions to ex-MLAs. The bill was passed on 30 June 2022 by the Punjab Assembly. The bill would save the state government Rs 19.53 crore annually.

Law Enforcement
In April, the government formed a special anti-gangster task force to go after the gangs.

In a meeting with the Canadian high commissioner, CM Mann suggested increasing cooperation between Canadian police agencies and Punjab Police to reduce crime due to gangs operating in both countries.

Mohalla Clinics
CM announced plans to launch Mohalla Clinics in Punjab on Independence day, to provide free health care to public. The clinics were planned to be set up in both urban and rural areas in phased manner. On 15 August 2022, 75 Aam Aadmi Clinics were made functional.

Mining 
In August 2022 Minister for mines, Harjot Singh Bains introduced stricter regulations for mining. The regulations were designed to impact the sand mafia in Punjab.

Sports 
The budget for the ministry of sports was increased from 162 crore to Rs 223 crore. Astroturf was announced to be set up at Ropar.

Transportation
In June 2022, Mann announced Volvo bus service between IGI Airport and different Punjab cities of the state. The tariff charged by the PRTC and PEPSU buses for the Airport were announced at half the rates being charged by the private bus operators. Mann said that this service would break the monopoly of a few families in bus business with political links.

In 2022 Mann approved setting up of a Punjab Aviation Museum at the civil aerodrome in Patiala. The museum would include replicas of aircraft, photographs, maps, models, diagrams, clothing and equipment used by aviators. Punjab's progress in the civil aviation will be shown in the museum.

Free electricity
Fulfilling their election promise of providing free electricity, from 1 July the people across Punjab would get 300 units of free electricity.  73.39 lakh domestic consumers were estimated to benefit from the scheme.

Defence
On 30 June Punjab Legislative Assembly with Aam Aadmi Party majority passed a resolution recommending the state government that it urges the Union government of India to immediately rollback the scheme. The resolution was opposed by BJP members of the assembly who were in minority. Punjab was the only state to pass such a resolution.

Council of Ministers

By Minister

By departments
An alphabetical list of all the departments of Punjab Government with terms :

By year
 2022 : On 21 March, Bhagwant Mann announced the  first appointment of ten ministers to the departments of Punjab state government.

 2022 : On 5 July, Bhagwant Mann announced the expansion of cabinet with five new ministers to the departments of Punjab state government.

References

Further reading
  

 

Lists of current Indian state and territorial ministries
Mann
2022 establishments in Punjab, India
Cabinets established in 2022
State cabinet ministers of Punjab, India
2022 in Indian politics
Current governments
Mann ministry